Muath, Muadh, Muad, Muaz, Mowwadh, or similar can mean: muadh, which is an Arabic name that means: the protector

People

Given name

 Muad Mohamed Zaki (born 1982), politician and businessman
 Muadh ibn Jabal (died 639), Islamic scholar
 Muath Al-Kasasbeh (1988–2015), Jordanian military pilot captured and burned alive by the Islamic State of Iraq and the Levant
 Moath Makahleh (born 1974), Jordanian engineer, retired colonel.
 Muath Mahmoud (born 1993), Jordanian footballer
 Mowwaz (or Muadh) ibn Afra (died 624), participant in Battle of Badr
 Muadh ibn Amr, participant in Battle of Badr